Eublemma parallela is a species of moth of the family Erebidae. It is found in Russia, Ukraine, Turkey, Syria, Armenia, Kazakhstan, Iraq and Iran.

Adults are on wing from June to July in one generation.

References

External links
Lepiforum

Boletobiinae
Moths described in 1842
Moths of Europe
Moths of Asia
Taxa named by Christian Friedrich Freyer